The following is a list of characters of the Taiwanese television series KO One, which aired between November 2013 and April 2013.

The Leaders of Zhong Ji Yi Ban (終極一班)

Wang Da Dong (汪大東)
KO Number: 3rd.Battle level: 9000+.Age: 18.Weapon/Skill: Dragon Tattooed Pan (龍紋鏊).Title: Egomaniac (自大狂), Brother Dong (東哥) and Brother Da Dong (大東哥).Aura: Red.Status: Alive.Actor:  Jiro Wang (汪東城) - Fahrenheit (飛輪海) / Dong Cheng Wei (東城衛). "LaU"

Biography: The ring leader of the school gang "Zhong Ji Yi Ban" (終極一班 / Ultimate Class). Self-confident and stubborn. Acts as an obedient child in front of his parents, and has attempted to keep his parents in the dark about his school life. Everybody in Zhong Ji Yi Ban listens to what he says.

Da Dong is number three on the KO Rank and has the fighting count of 9000.

Although Da Dong seems harsh and cold, he is actually a good person at heart and shows his caring side whenever his friends need help.

Because of his confidence and stubbornness, Ya Se often calls him "Zi Da Kuang" (自大狂 / Egomaniac).

Hobbies:
Da Dong often spends time singing with an underground music band named Dong Cheng Wei (東城衛) to enhance his power.

Love life:
Da Dong has been in love with a girl named An Qi since he was a kid, but was too shy to reveal it. However, during her time in America, she's written over 500 letters to him, and though he did not respond to any of the letters, he has been secretly collecting and reciting them. The two of them were a couple at a point in the storyline, but eventually broke up due to Da Dong's crush on his teacher and his best friend Xiao Yu's crush on An Qi. And the fact that they were being targeted by a powerful enemy.

Specialty: He carries the "Long Wen Ao" (龍紋鏊 / Dragon Tattooed Pan) as his primary weapon. A unique aspect of this weapon is that it can vary its master's fighting count according to the opponent's fighting count; it becomes stronger when fighting strong opponents and remain normal when facing weaker ones (遇強則強、遇弱則弱).

Before revealing his main weapon, he has also been seen using a normal cooking pan to fight ordinary gangsters.

Sequels: In The X-Family (終極一家), he becomes a secondary character and is desperate to restore his powers. Realizing his desperation, his friend Xiu tells him that he may have a chance to restore his powers: if he can find an alternate counterpart in another dimension. During Xiu's search, he finds out that Da Dong has an alternate counterpart in the Iron Dimension called Xia Tian and later another counterpart named Zack from the Bronze Dimension. Turns out, Xia Tian shares his ability to vary the flow of his power according to the opponent's power level.

In K.O.3an Guo (終極三國), Da Dong travels to the Silver Dimension with his friends. While trying his cellphone's camera, he accidentally drops a coin that causes a gigantic rock to fall on Xiu's alternate counterpart, Liu Bei. He then takes Liu Bei back to his dimension for treatment while Xiu is forced to take Liu Bei's place until he recovers from his injuries. Later, Sun Ce, Da Dong's alternate counterpart in the Silver Dimension appears.

Alternate counterparts:
Da Dong has three alternate counterparts introduced throughout the Zhong Ji series:
In the Iron Dimension: Xia Tian (夏天) and his alternate personality Gui Long (鬼龍)  from the second series The X-Family (终极一家). Xia Tian is the current ultimate power-user in the twelve dimensions. He is the one who restored Da Dong's powers.
In the Bronze Dimension: Zack a well-known psycho killer sent to the Iron Dimension in attempt to make Xia Tian stronger from the second series The X-Family (终极一家).
In the Silver Dimension: Sun Ce (孫策) the student-body president of Jiangdong High School (江東高校) and Sun Shang Xiang (孫尚香)'s older brother from the third series K.O.3an Guo (終極三國).

Wang Ya Se (王亞瑟)
KO Number: 3rd.Battle level: 9000.Age: 18.Weapon/Skill: The Sword in the Stone (石中劍).Title: Narcissist (自戀狂) and King Arthur (亞瑟王).Aura: Light blue.Status: Alive.Actor: Calvin Chen (辰亦儒) - Fahrenheit (飛輪海).

Biography: The son of the gangster leader of "Tu Long Bang" (土龍幫).

Rich, powerful, self-centered, and his concerns are his looks.

His name is a Chinese translation of the English name "Arthur".

Like Da Dong, he has a 3rd position on the KO Rank, his fighting count being 9000. Because he and Da Dong shared the third position, he joined Zhong Ji Yi Ban intending to challenge him, but before they could fight, they became best buddies.

Titles:
Most people know him as "Ya Se Wang" (亞瑟王 / King Arthur), his last name switching positions with his first name: but Da Dong often calls him "Zi Lian Kuang" (自戀狂 / Narcissist).

Being framed:
He is the first person to find out that Lei Ke Si is KO 2, although nobody seems to believe him. He has been framed by Lei Ke Si for an assortment of malicious attacks on classmates, and has left the class at a point in the storyline to prove his innocence. When Lei Ke Si finally reveals his identity, he exonerates his name and returns to school.

Hobbies:
Ya Se's most notable habit is to quote authors like Shakespeare. His favorite quote being "To be or not to be, that is a question".

Love life:
Although Ya Se only loves himself, he eventually learns to love others when a girl named Cai Wu Xiong risks her own life to save him. When he finds out that Wu Xiong is aging to death, he forces himself to fall in love with her in order to save her, which he succeeds and learns the true meaning of love - the most precious thing of all.

Specialty: His primary weapon is the Shi Zhong Jian (石中劍 / Sword in the Stone) - a spiritual dagger created by the wizard Merlin and used by King Arthur. When he removes the stone from the dagger, the sword essence will possess Ya Se, allowing him to instantly gain evil powers at the expense of losing control over his own actions.

His other special ability is his super-speed (an ability that other people can also use), which he indicates is well-known, which probably means that he can run faster than others.

Sequels: In The X-Family (終極一家), he becomes a secondary character and finds out that he has an alternate counterpart in the Iron Dimension called Lan Ling Wang. Both of them carry a sword reclaimed from the spiritual realm as primary weapons and come with instruction manuals.

In K.O.3an Guo (終極三國), Ya Se travels to the Silver Dimension with his friends. While Da Dong is trying out his cellphone's camera, Da Dong accidentally drops a penny that causes a gigantic rock to fall on Xiu's alternate counterpart, Liu Bei. He then takes Liu Bei back to his world for treatment while Xiu takes his role until he recovers from his injuries.

Alternate counterpart:
Ya Se has one alternate counterpart introduced throughout the Zhong Ji series:
In the Iron Dimension: Lan Ling Wang (蘭陵王) from the second series The X-Family (终极一家). He is the one who restored Ya Se's powers.

Ding Xiao Yu (丁小雨)
KO Number: 4th.Battle level: 8500.Age: 18.Weapon/Skill: Powerful Fists (力量強大的拳頭).Title: King of Fighters (耐打王) and Formidable Xiao Yu (要命的小雨).Aura: Yellow.Status: Alive.Actor: Aaron Yan (炎亞綸) - Fahrenheit (飛輪海).

Biography: Xiao Yu is an exchange student from "Tuo Nan High School" (拓南高中), known as the 4th ranked fighter on the KO Rank, his fighting count being 8500. He is prone to giving others cold looks if they are not willing to leave him alone. Xiao Yu is also very straightforward.

From the beginning, he appeared to be a very quiet and mysterious kid, but after befriending Ya Se and Da Dong, he becomes more open and even starts to smile.

He doesn't like violence, but if anyone hits his head, he will definitely fight back.

Unlike everybody else, he lives in a tent instead of a real home and has no family of his own.

Hobbies:
Xiao Yu is more likely to be found spending time in the music room because he likes to play the piano. His music is so touching that anyone who hears it can be reminded of what it's like to love others.

Love life:
Xiao Yu carries a cellphone with him, but never gives his number to anyone - including Da Dong and Ya Se. But when he falls in love with Da Dong's girlfriend, An Qi, he gives it to her and tells her to call him whenever she's in need of help. Da Dong eventually finds out that he is in love with An Qi and the three of them become odd against each other, and prefer to rather not talk about their relationship. Their relationship ends with An Qi deciding to return to America. After this, Da Dong and Xiao Yu solve their problem and become friends again. However, Xiao Yu declares that An Qi belongs with Da Dong and not him.

Specialty: Unlike Da Dong and Ya Se, he uses his powerful fists as weapons and has the fighting count of 8500. Zheng hui left fist is said to have the power of an atomic bomb, while his right fist has ten times the power of his left fist. However, if he uses the right hand, he will become unable to use more power within three hours and might risk losing his own life.

Xiao Yu can also produce healing factor to speed up the healing process of his injuries.

Sequels: In The X-Family (終極一家), he becomes a secondary character and finds out that he has an alternate counterpart in the Iron Dimension called Jiu Wu. While Xiao Yu is quiet and turned inward, Jiu Wu is more open and alive.

In K.O.3an Guo (終極三國), Xiao Yu travels to the Silver Dimension with his friends and meet new friends there. While Da Dong is trying out his cellphone's camera, Da Dong accidentally drops a coin that causes a gigantic rock to fall on Xiu's alternate counterpart, Liu Bei. He then takes Liu Bei back to his dimension for treatment while Xiu takes Liu Bei's role until he recovers from his injuries.

Alternate counterpart:
Xiao Yu has one alternate counterpart introduced throughout the Zhong Ji series:
In the Iron Dimension: Jiu Wu (灸舞), also known as Meng Zhu (盟主) the ruler of the Iron Dimension from the second series The X-Family (终极一家). He is the one who restored Xiao Yu's powers.

Lei Ke Si (雷克斯) / Wu Shi Duo (武屍奪)
KO Number: 2nd.Battle level: 10000.Age: 18.Weapon/Skill: Ares' Hand (阿瑞斯之手).Title: War God (戰神).Aura: Green (initially) / Blue.Status: Alive.Actor: Danson Tang (唐禹哲).

Biography: Da Dong's childhood friend whom Da Dong has absolute trust in. Lei Ke Si has liked An Qi since they were kids, but because she was in love with Da Dong, he collected a strong anger and has been trying to take vengeance on his best friend.

In school, he is known as Da Dong's brain.

His name is a Chinese translation of the English name "Lex".

Hidden identity:
Because of his disguise as a weak kid with good intentions, nobody knows Lei Ke Si is actually KO 2 - the next strongest fighter on the KO Rank, and his fighting count being 10000.

Revelation:
When An Qi tells him why she likes Da Dong, his anger grows to a maximum point and he decides to take full action in taking out Da Dong, including hurting An Qi and revealing his true identity to the world. The two battle each other at that point, but Da Dong allows him to win. When he asks why he did it, Da Dong replies it is because he still considers him as his best friend. After being reminded of how pure Da Dong's friendship with him really is, they solve all of the anger and hatred he has had over the years and the two become friends again.

Return:
Some time after he left the gang to start over, he becomes captured by their enemy Hei Long and converted into a "Wu Shi" (武屍) named "Duo" (奪), and is sent on a mission to kill Da Dong. However, his evil powers are subdued by a mysterious man midway through the show, allowing him to return to Da Dong as a friend. In the end, he helps the others fight against Hei Long and succeeds, but loses his powers in the process.

Specialty: His weapon is "Ah Rui Xi Zhi Shou" (阿瑞斯之手 / Ares' Hand), a metal glove reclaimed from the realm of darkness. After he leaves the class, he leaves the weapon behind and asks Jin Bao San to tell Da Dong to keep it for him. When he returns in the final episodes, he lends the weapon to Xiao Yu to fight against Hei Long.

Sequel: In The X-Family (終極一家), but he has made appearance in the introduction theme, and in a flashback of their battle against Hei Long and in a picture of the Top 10 KO Rankings Record. His alternate counterpart is Xia Yu - both are good in school and have revealed evil tendencies at some point.

In K.O.3an Guo (終極三國), Lei Ke Si is not going to the Silver Dimension. But his alternate counterpart is Sima Yi (司馬懿) in the Silver Dimension.

Alternate counterpart:
Lei Ke Si has one alternate counterpart introduced throughout the Zhong Ji series:
In the Iron Dimension: Xia Yu (夏宇) and his alternate personality Gui Feng (鬼鳳) from the second series The X-Family (终极一家). Xia Yu is the eldest of the three siblings in the Xia Family and is the "original power-user of fire" (火的原位異能行者). Both being very smart and can therefore handle school-life very easily.

The other Students of Zhong Ji Yi Ban (終極一班)

Huang An Qi (黃安琪)
Age: 18.Status: Alive.Actress: Stephanie Lee (李姝妍).

Biography: An Qi is daughter of a famous politician, and is also a childhood friend of Da Dong and Lei Ke Si. She has been in love with Da Dong for a really long time, but never knew how he felt, nor the fact that Lei Ke Si was in love with her as well.

She moved to America five years ago, but during that time she has written over five hundred letters to Da Dong - two letters per week. She never got any response from Da Dong for any of her letters, but he has secretly been collecting and memorizing them.

Love and disappointment:
Her love for Da Dong is the reason to why Lei Ke Si holds such anger against Da Dong. When Lei Ke Si finally reveals his identity as KO 2 and gets Da Dong into a hospital, she decides to return to America in order to forget about everything she feels about Da Dong, because she believes it is her love that has caused the rivalry between him and his best friend.

Da Dong doesn't want her to leave, and with a little nudge from Xiao Yu, he finally finds the courage to reveal how he truly feels about her. They become a couple since then, but when Tian Xin, their homeroom teacher, begins to date a college student, Da Dong starts acting weird and making trouble with the gang. Ever since then, their relationship becomes unstable and unclear, because she can tell that he is in love with their teacher as well and his new best friend Xiao Yu being in love with her.

Leave:
After causing another rivalry between Xiao Yu and Da Dong and knowing that there is something strange going on between the KO fighters and a mysterious evil force, she returns to America and resumes to writing letters to Da Dong. And though she may never see Da Dong or Xiao Yu again, she is glad to have been with both of them because the memories are enough for her to have for the rest of her life to think about.

Sha Jie (煞姊)
KO Number: 13th.Age: 18.Title: Ultimate Class Flower (終極班花) and Little Sister Sha (煞妹妹).Status: Alive.Actress: Sunnie Huang (黃小柔).

Biography: Number 13th on the KO Rank.

Sha Jie is the leader in the girl-gang of the class. For a girl, she is extremely mean and fierce.

Love life:
She has been in love with Da Dong since before the start of the series, but he hasn't shown any sign of liking her back, at all. Seeing Da Dong and An Qi together makes her angry and she leaves the school along with the show and is never seen again, though she is sometimes mentioned by Jin Bao San.

Because of her fondness of Da Dong, she often shows dislike to Wang Ya Se (王亞瑟).

Specialty: Her real capabilities are unknown, but her strength appears to be above human.

Sequel: Like Lei Ke Si, she appears only in the introduction theme of The X-Family (終極一家). Her alternate counterpart is Xia Mei. They both share the same personality, only Sha Jie is more devotive than Xia Mei, who is rather obsessive. laU..

Alternate counterpart:
Sha Jie has one alternate counterpart introduced throughout the Zhong Ji series:
 In the Iron Dimension: Xia Mei (夏美) from the second series The X-Family (终极一家). Both Xia Mei and Sha Jie are instinctive, they act very petty and hostile against those they hate and are passionate or rather obsessive towards those they love. However, Sha Jie is more devoted.
Sha Jie's status as KO 13, would seem that she is the only person whose power is stronger than her Iron Dimension counterpart's.

Cai Wu Xiong (蔡五熊)
KO Number: 10th.Battle level: -.Age: 18.Title: Little King Kong Sister (金剛妹妹) or King Kong Girl (金剛妹).Weapon/Skill: Rapid regeneration, superhuman strength, telepathy and Bear Pearl (熊珠).Status: Alive.Actress: Wu Xiong (五熊).

Biography: A character who came into the show during the later episodes.

She is the younger sister of Cai Yun Han - KO 7. Wu Xiong grew up in the jungle with gorillas, and communicates in a non-human language. Wu Xiong returned to her family a year before her appearance in the show.

Her name is referred to as "five bears," because she killed five bears when she was still a newly born baby and was therefore named "Wu Xiong" (五熊), meaning five bears in translation. Because of her gorilla-like appearance and behavior, everyone in class refer to her as "Jin Gang Mei Mei" (金剛妹妹 / Little King Kong Sister).

Appearance:
In the initial episodes that she appeared in, she had long hair that covers her face and wore clothes that made her look like a gorilla. But later on, she changed her image when Ya Se reminded her that she is living in a human society.

Future knowledge:
She is the only notable person to have read the entire series of "Jin Bi Dian Long" (金筆點龍 / The Golden Pen Touches The Dragon) and therefore knows something about the future, but does not want to reveal it because she was afraid of reprisals.

Love life:
She falls in love with Ya Se (亞瑟) the first time she meets him, mainly because she has known that he is the man for her since she was three years old. Although Ya Se didn't like her at first, Wu Xiong eventually succeeds in capturing his heart when she uses her "Xiong Zhu" (熊珠 / Bear Pearl) to save him and almost died because of losing it. According to her future knowledge, their love won't last long, but will be beautiful while it does. However, we do not know if this actually will happen or if he will lose his internal fight with the Demon Sword or if he wasn't going to survive the battle against Hei Long.

Specialty: Wu Xiong has the power of superhuman strength and rapid regeneration; an ability that accelerates the healing process.

Wu Xiong also has some sort of telepathic abilities, as she can always tell what Ya Se needs or wants without saying it.

Sequels: Wu Xiong is not seen in The X-Family (終極一家) and her whereabouts remained unknown, but she was briefly mentioned by Da Dong.

In K.O.3an Guo (終極三國), Wu Xiong is revealed to have an alternate counterpart in the Silver Dimension named Xiao Qiao. Unlike Wu Xiong, she doesn't seem to possess any special capabilities, and Xiao Qiao is younger sister of Da Qiao.

Alternate counterpart:
Wu Xiong has one alternate counterpart introduced throughout the Zhong Ji series:
In the Silver Dimension: Xiao Qiao (小喬) from the third series K.O.3an Guo (終極三國). She is Diao Chan’s best friend and Zhou Yu (周瑜)'s love interest.

Cai Yun Han (蔡雲寒)
KO Number: 7th.Battle level: 7000.Age: 18/19.Weapon/Skill: Pain Kills Desire To Live Truth Telling Whip (痛不欲生實話鞭).Title: Big King Kong Sister (金剛姊姊) and/or Big King Kong Sister (金剛姊).Aura: Pink.Status: Alive.Actress: .

Biography: A character that came into the show during the later episodes.

Cai Yun Han is the elder sister of Cai Wu Xiong. Since she is the only one that understands her sister's language, she serves as interpreter for the rest of the class. They transferred to Zhong Ji Yi Ban about a year after her sister returned to the family.

Because her parents died when she was young, she has been independent and does her best to take care of her sister, whom she is also very protective of. Because of her sister's gorilla-like appearance and behavior, Yun Han is nicknamed "Jing Gang Jie Jie" (金剛姊姊 / Big King Kong Sister) based on their bond as blood-related sisters.

Power position:
She is number 7th on the KO Rank and the only notable female fighter to be listed as one of the Top 10 KO fighters. Her fighting count is 7000. Since Wang Da Dong, Wang Ya Se, Ding Xiao Yu, Lei Ke Si and Ji An are strongest in the class, she becomes the sixth strongest member, but is nonetheless the strongest female member.

Dislike of Wang Ya Se:
She did not like Ya Se initially because he was always rude towards her sister and nicknamed him "Chou Pi Ya Se Wang" (臭屁亚瑟王 / Stinking King Arthur), but that changes when he tries to save Wu Xiong from aging to death by forcing himself to fall in love with her.

Love life:
Ever since Yun Han found out that Ji An is a demon fighter, she has been falling for him, but because of his cold behavior, the two of them are put in an awkward stage of relationship.

Specialty: She uses a whip called "Tong Bu Yu Sheng Shi Hua Bian" (痛不欲生实话鞭 / Pain Kills Desire To Live Truth Telling Whip) that causes people who get whipped to reveal their lies and secrets to reduce the pain.

Sequel: Unlike the others, Yun Han has two alternate counterparts in The X-Family (終極一家), which are Han and Bing Xin. They are originally the same person, but were divided in two during an experiment. Their names have similarities to "cold".

In K.O.3an Guo (終極三國), Cai Yun Han is not going to the Silver Dimension. But her alternate counterpart is Da Qiao in the Silver Dimension, and Da Qiao is elder sister of Xiao Qiao, Wu Xiong's counterpart.

Alternate counterpart:
Yun Han has three alternate counterparts introduced throughout the Zhong Ji series:
In the Iron Dimension: She has two alternate counterparts, identical twins named Han (寒) and Bing Xin (冰心), both of whom are descendants from a powerful family of supernatural female warriors. Their names also carry a similar meaning; Han (寒) means "cold", and Bing Xin (冰心) means "heart of ice".
In the Silver Dimension: Da Qiao from the third series K.O.3an Guo (終極三國). Da Qiao is known as the most beautiful student in Jiangdong High School (江東高校) and is Xiao Qiao (小喬)'s older sister.

Jin Bao San (金寶三)
KO Number: 135th.Age: 19.Title: Nei Shang Wang (內傷王) and Bao San Ge (寶三哥).Status: Alive.Actor: Zhang Hao Ming / Jin Bao San (張皓明 / 金寶三).

Biography: The monitor of the class, and is Number 135th on the KO Rank. He is usually in charge with the boys in class, or rather make them followers.

His performance and involvement in the class was part of what made the story interesting.

He is often thinks he is better than everyone in class and repeatedly attempts to dethrone Da Dong so that he can be the leader of Zhong Ji Yi Ban again.

According to himself, he was one of the top ten KO fighters before Da Dong wounded him in a challenge and turned off his powers. However, his stupidity and arrogance seem to be with-born.

Biggest secret:
When Yun Han whipped him with her weapon, he was forced to reveal his biggest secret: he was in love with Da Dong once.

Specialty: His only known ability so far is eavesdropping from afar using a large eavesdropping device.

Sequels: In The X-Family (終極一家), Ya Se (亞瑟) mentions that Jin Bao San has become Da Dong's bodyguard. His alternate counterpart is Ren Chen Wen - they both share the same personality.

In K.O.3an Guo (終極三國), Jin Bao San is revealed to have another alternate counterpart in the Silver Dimension named Jiang Gan, who is also class monitor of his class.

Alternate counterpart:
Jin Bao San has two alternate counterpart introduced throughout the Zhong Ji series:
In the Iron Dimension: Ren Chen Wen (任晨文) from the second series The X-Family (终极一家). Ren Chen Wen is a friend/follower of Xia Tian (夏天) at school.
In the Silver Dimension: Jiang Gan (蔣幹) from the third series K.O.3an Guo (終極三國). Jiang Gan is the class monitor and student body vice president. He likes to blackmail younger and inferior students.

Ji An (技安)
Weapon/Skill: Demon Ripping Axe (拔魔斬)Title: Demon Fighter (拔魔戰士).Aura: Orange.Status: Alive.Actor: Andy Gong (龔繼安).

Biography: A boy member of the class and one of Jin Bao San's followers.

Changes:
In the initial episodes, he seems like a playful school boy who hangs out with Jin Bao San's "gang" and doesn't seem to have much fighting skills. But as the story progresses, his attitude and personality suddenly change, making him a more serious character. When Ya Se begins to get possessed by the sword demon, Ji An reveals himself as a "Ba Mo Zhan Shi" (拔魔戰士 / Demon Fighter), whose mission is to kill evil whenever it surfaces.

Mission and loyalty:
Because he was taught never to let his feelings cloud his judgment and affect the outcome of his mission, his sharp focus to kill the evil that lurks inside of Ya Se's body often puts his loyalty to Da Dong on test.

Other than killing evils, he declares protecting the class as his second mission.

Since his path is different, his name does not exist amongst the KO Ranked fighters.

Love life:
Ever since Cai Yun Han found out that he was a demon fighter, she has been falling for him, but his cold behavior put them in an awkward stage of relationship. But he does not deny that he has feelings to Yun Han himself.

Specialty: Ji An carries a powerful axe called "Ba Mo Zhan" (拔魔斬 / Demon Ripping Axe), a weapon reclaimed from the spiritual realm and is mainly used for killing evil.

He can also suppress evil essences with his power, but that method only lasts temporarily and once the power wears off, the evil essences become ten times stronger than they were before.

Before Ji An revealed the axe, he wielded another weapon - a sword made of bamboo used for kendo training. It disappeared after Ji An revealed his true identity.

Sha Yu (鯊魚)
Status: Alive.Actor: a Chord (謝和弦).

Biography: Another member of the class Zhong Ji Yi Ban. He is Jin Bao San's follower, and often takes a big cannon with him - using it as his weapon.

He is also normally seen with a small blue stuffed shark toy, earning him the nickname "shark" or "shark-boy".

Sequel: His alternate counterpart in The X-Family (終極一家) is a singing member of the band Dong Cheng Wei named a Chord.

Alternate counterpart:
Sha Yu has one alternate counterpart introduced throughout the Zhong Ji series:
In the Iron Dimension: a Chord from the second series The X-Family (终极一家). a Chord was the lead singer of the band Dong Cheng Wei (東城衛) until he was promoted to become the new leader of Bei Cheng Wei (北城衛) upon which Xia Tian (夏天) decides to join Dong Cheng Wei (東城衛) as the new lead vocalist. He is somewhat of a funny guy, who does not know the appropriate time to talk.

Xiao La (小辣)
Status: Alive.Actor: Lu Jian Yu / Xiao La (陸建宇 / 小辣).

Biography: Another member of the class Zhong Ji Yi Ban, he is as fat as Jin Bao San. He is also Jin Bao San's follower.

He has an older brother named Da La (大辣), but their size and heights appear to be opposite.

Sequel: He has an alternate counterpart in The X-Family (終極一家) called Xia Mi.

Tao Zi (桃子) & Bai Linda (白琳達)
KO Number: 14th & 15th.Status: Alive.Actresses: Wang Huai Xuan (王懷萱) & Ke Tian Bei (柯天貝).

Biography: As the 14th and 15th ranked fighters on the KO Rank, they are both Sha Jie (煞姊)'s followers, who is ranked above them.

Initially, Bai Linda had a crush on Lei Ke Si, but she lost that feeling after finding out that he was evil.

They remained in the class after Sha Jie's departure until Wang Da Dong (汪大東) was attacked and were suddenly written off in the middle of the show.

Xia Ba (下巴) & Liang Zhi (兩指)
Status: Alive.Actresses: Li Yi Hua (李衣驊) & Wang Qian Cheng (王巧琤).

Biography: Xia Ba and Liang Zhi are two sisters who joined Zhong Ji Yi Ban late, noted to have been transferred from another school right after Bai Linda and Tao Zi left.

Their way of speaking tends to be very old-fashioned and theater/opera-like.

Specialty: 
Xia Ba is known for slapping people's chins while Liang Zhi is known to poke people's noses with her two fingers when people offend them or when people look down on their powers, giving them the nicknames of "chin" and "two fingers".

Sequel: 
Liang Zhi is the only sister to have an alternate counterpart in The X-Family (終極一家).

Alternate counterpart:
Liang Zhi has one alternate counterpart introduced throughout the Zhong Ji series:
In the Iron Dimension:

Zhu Pi (豬皮)
Status: Alive.Actor: Xu Zhi Yan (許智彥).

Biography: Another member of the class Zhong Ji Yi Ban, and another follower of Jin Bao San.

His name refers to "pig skin".

This character is suddenly written off in the middle of the show.

Fu Tou (斧頭)
Status: Alive.Actor: Chen Zhen Wei / Fu Tou (陳振偉 / 斧頭).

Biography: Another member of the class Zhong Ji Yi Ban.

He is also Jin Bao San's follower.

His name refers to "axe".

This character is suddenly written off before the end of the show.

Faculty

Tian Xin (田欣)
Potential battle level: 1000000.Age: 25.Title: Homeroom teacher (班導) and Melody.Status: Alive.Actress: Yin Yue / Melody (殷悦).

Biography: The homeroom teacher of Zhong Ji Yi Ban (終極一班). Because of her little brother's past and 'incident', she went to college to become a teacher, in hopes to get bad students back on the right track and make them good again.

As a person, she is very fun-loving and likes to babble a lot when she gets angry.

Becoming Zhong Ji Yi Ban's teacher:
At first, Da Dong did not like her at all because of her position as a teacher, but was eventually touched by her kindness and decided to let her become their homeroom teacher and help them get into college.

Love life:
Tian Xin's love life is the least interesting, but nevertheless complicated. First, she dates a young boy Ceng Shao Zong, and unwittingly makes Da Dong so jealous that he starts causing trouble again. Second, her boyfriend has a complicated relationship with his birth mother and Da Dong once mistook him for cheating behind her back. After everything that happened, Shao Zhong decides to return to America with his mother and the two separate from there.

Potential:
Tian Xin doesn't have any fighting skills of her own, but she is born with great potential to become an extremely powerful warrior, possibly the most powerful one in the world since her kind of potential is quite rare.

Departure:
When the school gang finds out that their enemy was after her because of her potential, Da Dong's parents take her to safety. But despite her absence, Da Dong decides to keep his promise and makes sure that he gets his gang into college.

Although she is not seen again after her departure, it would seem that she has returned to school and is reunited with her supposed-to-be-dead brother after the final battle.

Qian Lai Ye (錢萊冶) / Jin Bi Ke (金筆客)
Age: 50.Status: Alive.Actor: Ba Ge (巴戈).

Biography: The principal. He's very greedy and often plans on how to make more money. However, he is in fact Jin Bi Ke (金筆客), the legendary author of "Jin Bi Dian Long" (金筆點龍 / The Golden Pen Touches The Dragon), a manga that foretells the past, the present and the future, which is also the cause of the war between good and evil.

Balance preserver:
As the personal himself, he claims that he is neither good nor evil, but the neutral person who preserves the world's balance.

Specialty: His real capabilities are a mystery, however, it would seem that he has the ability to project images and to influence someone's heart and mind.

Sequel: In, K.O.3an Guo, his alternate counterpart is Zuo Ci, The Creator of the Eight Doors Golden Lock Formation (八門金鎖陣)

Jia Yong (賈勇)
Age: 45.Status: Alive.Actor: Xia Jing Ting (夏靖庭).

Biography: The school dean. He is self-centered and extremely stupid. His performance is part of the reason to what made the show interesting.

He is often seen hanging around the school with the Chinese teacher and the drillmaster.

Sequel: His Iron Dimensional counterpart in The X-Family (終極一家) is a demon hunter with supernatural powers.

In the Silver Dimension, he has an alternate counterpart named Lu Bo She.

Gu Wen Jing (古文靜)
Age: 40.Status: Alive.Actress: Ye Hui Zhi (葉蕙芝).

Biography: A Chinese teacher who wears glasses, and is often seen hanging with the school dean, whom she's in love with, and the drillmaster. Because Miss Tian is beautiful, she is often jealous of her getting all the attention.

This character disappeared before the end of the show.

Sequel:
Gu Wen Jing has an alternate counterpart in the 2009 series, K.O.3an Guo, named Mei Niang.

Su Bu Qi (蘇布啓)
Age: 30.Status: Alive.Actor: Jian Han Zong (簡漢宗).

Biography: The drillmaster. He is often seen hanging around the school with the Chinese teacher and the school dean, following them as their minion.

Sequels: In The X-Family (終極一家), the drillmaster's alternate counterpart in the Iron Dimension works as a messenger (信哥) for the Ye He Na La family (葉赫那啦家族). Another counterpart is Lan Ling Wang's ancestor, Gu La Yi Er Zhou Wang, the first ancestor to be cursed by the Ye He Na La family.

In K.O.3an Guo, he has an unnamed alternate counterpart presented in the Silver Dimension.

Dong Cheng Wei (東城衛)

Xiu (脩)
Status: Alive.Actor: Shu Chen / Xiu (陳德修 / 脩) - Dong Cheng Wei (東城衛).

Biography: A member of the band Dong Cheng Wei.

He is the head guitarist and the leader of the band.

Sequels: 
Not much is revealed about him in KO One except he is a guitarist in the band Dong Cheng Wei (東城衛). Xiu has a more significant role the second and third series The X-Family (終極一家) and K.O.3an Guo (終極三國).

In The X-Family (终极一家) he is the key figure who connects the storylines of the first two series.
In K.O.3an Guo (終極三國) Xiu's alternate counterpart, Liu Bei gets seriously injured by a gigantic rock and Xiu is forced to take his place and shape the legendary Three Kingdoms story.

Jie (戒)
Status: Alive.Actor: Vike Chen / Jie (陈志介/ 戒) - Dong Cheng Wei (東城衛).

Biography: A member of the band Dong Cheng Wei.

His position in the band of guitarist.

Sequel: 
He appears as himself in:
The X-Family (终极一家)
K.O.3an Guo (終極三國)

Deng (鐙)
Status: Alive.Actor: Dun Deng / Deng (鄧樺敦 / 鐙) - Dong Cheng Wei (東城衛).

Biography: A member of the band Dong Cheng Wei.

His position in the band is the guitarist.

Sequel: 
He appears as himself in:
The X-Family (终极一家)
K.O.3an Guo (終極三國)

Ming (冥)
Status: Alive.Actor: Ming Li / Ming (李明翰 / 冥) - Dong Cheng Wei (東城衛).

Biography: A member of the band Dong Cheng Wei.

His position in the band is the drummer.

Sequel: 
He appears as himself in:
The X-Family (终极一家)
K.O.3an Guo (終極三國)

Miscellaneous

Duan Chang Ren (斷腸人)
Status: Alive.Actor: Na Wei Xun (那維勲).

Biography: A strange and humorous man who owns a food stall. He is often mysterious and whenever Da Dong, Ya Se and Xiao Yu come to visit for food and have hard time understanding things, he gives them useful advice.

Powers lost:
He was a powerful fighter during his young age, but gave up his abilities in order to protect himself from his evil twin brother Hei Long (黑龍 / Black Dragon).

Duan Chang Ren's real name is Hong Long (紅龍 / Red Dragon). He changed his name to Duan Chang Ren after he relinquished his abilities.

Substitute teacher:
After Tian Xin is taken to safety, Duan Chang Ren becomes the class' substitute homeroom teacher under the name Duan Chang Ren (段常仁). Because he can speak Wu Xiong's gorilla language, he becomes the second interpreter for the class.

Sequel: After the events of KO One, Duan Chang Ren goes back to running his food stall. His alternate counterpart in the Iron Dimension is Ye Si Ren, Xia Tian's father.

Hei Long (黑龍)
Weapon/Skill: Sword in the Stone (石中劍).Status: Alive.Actor: Na Wei Xun (那維勲).

Biography: The final antagonist of the story. He is the evil twin brother of Duan Chang Ren (斷腸人).

He is the leader of Wu Li Cai Jue Suo (武力裁决所).

Hei Long has been trying to take over the world for the past 30 years, but has not been able to do so without Wang Ya Se's weapon: the "Shi Zhong Jian" (石中劍 / Sword in the Stone). He is in possession with the other Shi Zhong Jian, which can make him the lord of evil if both swords come together.

Targeted warriors:
Hei Long is known for destroying or enslaving powerful warriors in order to become the stronger opponent. Lei Ke Si and Tian Hong Guang were under his control for some time, and he also went after Tian Xin and Wang Da Dong, but failed to take both.

Defeat:
Eventually, he is defeated by the four KO fighters; Da Dong, Ya Se, Xiao Yu and Lei Ke Si.

Sequel: He made two minor appearances in the sequel, The X-Family (終極一家) when Xiu visited him to ask questions. Hei Long went crazy after the end of KO One. Like his twin brother, his alternate counterpart in the Iron Dimension is Ye Si Ren.

Wang Tian Yang (汪天養)
Age: 45.Title: Dao Feng (刀瘋).Status: Alive.Actor: Chen Bo Zheng / Ah Xi (陳博正 / 阿西).

Biography: Da Dong's father, who's a preacher in a church. Da Dong disguises as a good boy in school, in order to hide his true behavior. But his son doesn't know that his father was once a powerful assassin known as "Dao Feng" (刀瘋).

Retired:
He and his wife gave up their old lives to start anew, and therefore became a preacher.

Sequels: Da Dong's father doesn't appear in the sequel, nor is he mentioned. His alternate counterpart in the Iron Dimension is Xia Tian's maternal grandfather, Xia Liu.

In the upcoming K.O.3an Guo (終極三國), Preacher Wang is revealed to have another alternate counterpart in the Silver Dimension named Dong Zhuo, who is principal of a powerful school.

Ceng Mei Hao (曾美好)
Age: 42.Title: Dao Gui (刀鬼) and/or The Mother of Weapons (兵器之母).Status: Alive.Actress: Ah Jiao (阿嬌).

Biography: The mother of Da Dong. She is the housewife, but was once known as "Dao Gui" (刀鬼), an infamous weapon inventor and powerful assassin.

Retired:
She retired from her job as assassin in order to lead a normal life with her family.

During her time as an inventor, she has created over thousands of special weapons with different functions and effects.

Sequel: She does not appear in the sequel, but it seems that she has taught her son a few things about weapon developing after the events of this story.

Tian Hong Guang (田弘光) / Wu Shi Zun (武屍尊)
KO Number: 1st.Battle level: 12000.Age: 22.Weapon/Skill: Dragon Blade(龍斬).Title: Ah Guang (阿光).Status: Alive.Actor: Wu Chun (吳尊) - Fahrenheit (飛輪海).

Biography: The little brother of Tian Xin (田欣). He was reported to have been killed in a terrible car accident, but was in fact kidnapped by Wu Li Cai Jue Suo (武力裁决所) and was converted into a "Wu Shi" (武屍) named "Zun" (尊) to be under Hei Long (黑龍)'s control.

He was once ordered to capture his sister, but when she talked to him spiritually, he managed to pull his senses together and left her alone.

After a close encounter with the three KO fighters, Da Dong (汪大東) recognized him as Tian Xin's younger brother because he saw his picture while he stayed at his sister's place for recovery.

According to Ya Se (亞瑟), he is descended from a family of powerful martial artists.

Revelation as KO One:
No one knew about this until the KO fighters did some research, but he is actually the top fighter on the KO Rank - KO 1, with over 30000 fighting points .

Like Jiu Wu in The X-Family, he was an Meng Zhu (盟主 / ruler or leader) of the forces of good before he was captured.

Freedom:
After the final battle, he is finally free of Hei Long's control and returned to his life as a normal kid, but lost his powers in the process.

Specialty: Because the identity of KO. 1 has always been sealed from the public world, nothing is known about him or his abilities. His only shown specialty is that he can use a weapon called "Long Zhan" (龍斬 / Dragon Slicer).

He can easily break Xiao Yu's (小雨) left hand since his power is far superior, but he can't surpass his right hand which is ten times stronger.

Alternate counterpart:
Tian Hong Guang has one alternate counterpart introduced throughout the Zhong Ji series:
The Fire Ambassador (火焰使者) from the second series The X-Family (终极一家). The Fire Ambassador (火焰使者) exists beyond time and space, possessing unlimited power of fire. The Fire Ambassador is an executor who stops chaos and restores balance to a dimension, presumably good by nature. Whenever a dimension runs amuck, he will appear to annihilate all the evil with his power of fire. However, this also means that he will eliminate all life in that dimension making the circle of life start over again. from the very beginning. He only appears in the last few episodes of The X-family.

Ceng Shao Zong (曾少宗)
Age: 17.Status: Alive.Title: Voldemort (佛地魔)Actor: Figaro Tseng (曾少宗).

Biography: Tian Xin's little boyfriend. He is so smart that he entered college at the age of 12 and is currently studying to be a professor.

Birth mother:
Shao Zong has a secret: He was adopted by his parents at the age of 7. When he found his birth mother, he tried to reunite with her, but she refused to accept him as her son because of his super-cleverness and was ashamed of her own life-style. But thanks to the help of Zhong Ji Yi Ban (終極一班 / Ultimate Class), he is finally reunited with his mother.

Leaving Tian Xin:
Shao Zong once proposed to Tian Xin, but got turned down because of her promise to her class to make sure they get into college. He later returns to America with his birth mother to start anew. It is unclear whether or not their relationship has ended or is just put on hold.

Dislike from Da Dong:
Da Dong did not like him initially, preferring to call him "Fo Di Mo" (佛地魔 / Voldemort), because he was jealous of his closeness to Tian Xin, but after finding out that he was a good person at heart, he accepted the fact that Shao Zong wasn't as bad as he thought and gave them his blessing as well as helping Shao Zong reunite with his mother.

Dao Ba Jie Sen (刀疤傑森)
Title: Cha Cha Lian (叉叉脸 / X-Face).Status: Alive.Actor: Huang Wan Bo / K Yi Ba (黃萬伯 / K一吧).

Biography: A rival of Wang Ya Se. He has a scar that formulates an X on his face.

Dao Ba Jie Sen often tries to win Ya Se and his friends in combat, but always ends up getting beaten up or humiliating himself.

Sequel: His alternate counterpart appears in The X-Family (終極一家) as the key to close the space-time portal, known as Key Man. He does not appear in the sequel, but his name has been mentioned by Da Dong.

In K.O.3an Guo (終極三國), Dao Ba Jie Sen is revealed to have another alternate counterpart in the Silver Dimension called Li Shi Zhen.

Teacher Yu Sheng De (于聖德老師)
Status: Hospitalized.Actor: Li Jie Sheng (李傑聖).

Biography: A crazy former teacher of Tian Hong Guang. He kidnapped Tian Xin to prevent her students from getting into college, but was beaten by Da Dong's gang and sent to the psychiatric hospital at their teacher's request.

Sequel: His alternate counterpart in the Iron Dimension is Ye Si Si, a man with supernatural abilities.

Wan Bo (萬伯)
Status: Alive.Actor: Danny Dun (鄧安寧).

Biography: An Qi's boring and annoying butler.

He likes to talk a lot about his experiences.

Shi Huo(史火)
KO Number: 9th.Status: Alive.Actor: Darren (何政辉).
Guest starring*

Biography: A new guy that just fight his way into the chart whose position in the KO Rank is number 9. Not much is known about him but he is shown to be quite powerful as he managed to blocked an fully charged attack close to 10,000 battle point and his battle point is revealed to be 7,300  

Specialty: No real ability is shown from him, but he does exhibit super-speeding when approaching the KO fighters 
Dragon Shield(龙盾) 
Powerful defences that can blocked high level attack.

It Started with a Kiss (惡作劇之吻)
Characters from this category are originally characters from the drama series It Started with a Kiss (惡作劇之吻). They appeared in the original scene of the first episode where their new house fell down due to an earthquake, in which this series is actually caused by Lei Ke Si when he got angry and threw away a baseball, which unwittingly destroyed the house.

Yuan Xiang Qin (袁相琴)
Age: 18.Status: Alive.Actress: Ariel Lin (林依晨).

Biography: A cross-over character from the series "It Started with a Kiss" (惡作劇之吻).

Her unknown future to a wonderful life began on the day her new home fell down.

Yuan You Cai (袁有才)
Age: 40-49.Status: Alive.Actor: Tang Tsung Sheng (唐從聖).

Biography: Xiang Qin's father and sole parent after the death of his wife: he is a cross-over character from the series "It Started with a Kiss" (惡作劇之吻).

He found the man for his daughter after his new home was destroyed.

See also
List of The X-Family characters
List of K.O.3an Guo characters

References

KO One
KO One
+